The following is a glossary of terms used in card games. Besides the terms listed here, there are thousands of common and uncommon slang terms. Terms in this glossary should not be game-specific (e.g. specific to Bridge, Hearts, Poker or Rummy), but apply to a wide range of card games. For glossaries that relate primarily to one game or family of similar games, see Game-specific glossaries.

A 
  Ace
 The card with one pip in a pack of cards. Usually the highest card of a suit, ranking immediately above the King. May also occupy the lowest rank.
 Commonly refers to the Deuce or Two in German-suited packs which don't have real Aces. Often the highest card of a suit.

  Acorns
 One of the four suits in a German-suited pack of cards. Symbol: 

  active
 A card that is in play i.e. not sleeping.
 See active player.

  active player
 A player who receives cards in the current deal (i.e. is not sitting out because there are more players than the game is designed for as in four-hand Skat or five-hand Schafkopf).
 A player who has not withdrawn from the current deal but elected to play on (as in Rams or Poker).

  adversary
 Any opposing player, especially in two-hand games, or an opponent of the declarer. See defenders.

  adverse
 Pertaining to an adversary or opponent e.g. an adverse lead is one made by an opponent; adverse trumps are those held by one's opponent(s).

  age
 Order of priority for leading, betting or bidding, starting from the player next to the dealer. See eldest and youngest.

  alliance
 A temporary partnership that lasts only for the current deal or hand (e.g. Prop and Cop in Solo Whist or the normal game in Schafkopf).

  alone
 Playing without the help of a partner. See declarer and soloist.

  announce
 See declare.

  announcement
 Often used in both senses of declaration. However, Dummett prefers to restrict 'announcement' for the intention to achieve certain feats in play, while preferring 'declaration' for a statement that one has a special combination of cards in one's hand.

  ante
 A mandatory stake made before the game begins - usually by all players, sometimes by the dealer only. 
 Chips required to be put into the pot before the deal.
 To put in such chips.

  around the corner
 Phrase that describes sequences or runs that are built either side of the Ace e.g. Q K A 2 3 4  

 auction
 The period of bidding. The phase in some card games where players may bid to lead the game, or bid on a certain hand or privilege in that hand such as naming the trump suit. The player with the highest bid wins the auction and plays his chosen game or exercises his privilege. Often used in trick-taking games.

B

  balanced hand
 A hand of cards with no void suit, singleton or very long suit.

  banker
 Also called the house or the bank, the person responsible for distributing chips, keeping track of the buy-ins, and paying winners at the end of a banking game. A dealer against whom the punters bet.

  banking game
 A less-skilled card game of the gambling type in which one or more punters play against a banker, who controls the game.

   base value
 A constant factor in working out the value of a game e.g. Skat.

   batch
 See packet.

   Batons
 One of the four suits in a Latin-suited pack of cards. Symbol:  or 

  beater
 Term used in games of the Karnöffel family for quasi-trump cards able to beat those of lower rank or with no powers at all.

  belle
 The last game of the rubber.

  Bells
 One of the four suits in a German pack of cards. Symbol: 

  best
 Highest ranking.

  best card
 Highest card of a suit not yet played. The commanding card, master card. Also king card.

  bet
 Any wager on the outcome of a deal or game; any chips put in a pot; to put chips in a pot.
 The first bet in a betting interval.

 bête, bate, bete or beet.
 A penalty payment in certain games for e.g. for failing to take the minimum number of tricks, or for a stake or money which a player has lost. 
 A player who fails to takes a single trick in Mistigri. Likewise in Mauscheln, if the declarer, or Mauschler, fails to win a trick, he is the Mauschlerbete.
 Failure to make a contract.
 Conceding defeat without playing.
 Double bête: a double penalty, usually for failing to make a contract after choosing to play out the cards.

  bettel or bettler
 Bid or contract to win no tricks. Also misère.

  bid
 An offer to win a minimum or specified number of tricks or points or the privilege of naming the trump suit or the game.
  To make a bid.

  bidder
 Any player who makes a bid.
 The player who makes the highest bid and plays out his announced contract.

  blank
  In card-point games, a card that is worth no points. A non-counter.
  A hand with no court cards, i.e. only pip cards.
 A card that is unguarded by other, usually lower cards in the same suit: "I held the blank king of spades."
  To discard in such a way as to leave a card unprotected: "She blanked the King of Spades."
 To void a suit.

  blank suit
 A suit of which one holds no cards. A void (suit). To blank a suit is to get rid of all the cards of that suit from one's hand. 

  blaze
 A hand consisting only of court cards.

 blind
 See skat or widow.

 blocking
 Blocking a suit is keeping a high card back so that the player with a number of smaller cards cannot win tricks with them.

  bluff
 To attempt to deceive one's opponent(s) about the value of cards in one's hand.
 To use various tactics to mislead one's opponent(s) about the distribution of cards or one's strategy.

  build
 To add cards to those already on the table in order to extend a set or sequence.

  bonus
 An extra amount added to a player's score for the game for holding or winning certain cards or for achieving certain goals, such as Schneider.

  Bower
 The Jack of the trump suit or the Jack of the same colour as the trump suit e.g. in Euchre or Reunion.
 Left Bower: the Jack of the same colour as the trump suit.
 Right Bower: the Jack of the trump suit.

  bring in a suit
 Make tricks in a plain suit after the adverse trumps are exhausted.

  bury a card
 To place a card in the middle of the pack or discard pile so that it cannot be easily located.

  buy
 To receive a card from the dealer, face down, in return for a stake e.g. in Twenty-One.
 To receive or draw the spare hand, (skat or widow) in return for one's own hand and, possibly, a stake e.g. in Newmarket.
 To receive or pick up a card or cards in return for a hand card or cards e.g. in Préférence when the 2 talon cards are picked up and 2 discarded.
 To draw cards from the stock or talon.

C 

  call
 To declare, bid or pass. Any such declaration

  capture
 To pick up or take cards during play, often as part of a trick.

 captain 
 the player who directs the play of his team or who has the final decision in certain partnership games.

  card money
 The charge levied by an establishment on the playing of card games.

 card points
 The scoring value of a card or cards in point-trick games. Card points are used to determine the winner of a hand, based on the value of individual cards won. Not to be confused with game points. Sometimes called pips.

 card value
 See card points.

 carte blanche
 A hand with no court cards (see blank), for example, in Piquet, Comet or Bezique; or with either no court cards or no pip cards in Briscan

 case card
 The last remaining card of a denomination left in play.

  Cavalier
 The court card in certain card packs that usually ranks below the Queen and above the Jack.

  chicane
 A hand with no trumps. 

  chip
 A token used in place of money; a counter; to put chips in the pot Also jeton.

  chosen suit
 A suit characterised by a disturbed ranking and in which some cards have privileges over cards of the unchosen suits or special powers when led. Chosen suits are found in most games of the Karnöffel group. Sometimes called a selected suit. Sometimes also misnamed a trump suit.

  circle
 A local group of card players who meet regularly to play a particular game.

  clear
 Establish a card or suit by forcing out adverse higher cards or stoppers.
 Having taken no penalty cards e.g. in Hearts.

  close
 To bar further use of the talon by turning the trump card over and placing it on the top in card games such as Sixty-Six and Schnapsen.

   Clubs
 One of the four suits in a French-suited or Spanish-suited pack of cards. Symbol:  or 

  coat card
 Original term for court card, now obsolete.

  coffee housing
 To talk and act in order to mislead one's opponents about one's cards.

   Coins
 One of the four suits in a Latin-suited pack of cards. Symbol:  or 

  color, colour
 In French-suited packs, this is the colour of the suit symbols, which is red for Hearts and Diamonds and black for Clubs and Spades.

  combination
 Two or more cards that score a bonus when melded. Often called a meld.

  command
 The best card of a suit, usually applied to suits which the adversary is trying to establish. See best card, king card and master card.

  commanding card
 The best card of a suit in play. Also best card, king card or master card.
 The top trump or highest matador such as the Knave of Clubs in Knave Noddy or the Right Bower in Euchre.

 compendium game
 A game in which a number of different contracts is played in succession e.g. Barbu, Quodlibet and Poch.

  contract
 An agreement or obligation to play a certain type of game, to win a certain number of points or tricks in a hand, round or game.

  contractor
 The highest bidder who then plays out his contract.

  contrat
 A short rectangular counter or chip used in some French card games and Danish Tarok that is worth a number of jetons or fiches, typically 100 jetons.

  counter
 Object used to score. Token used in place of money; a chip. Also jeton.
 Card with a point value. Also counting card. 

  counting card
 A card that has an intrinsic scoring value when taken in a trick. Also counter.

  count out
 During play, to claim to have enough points for game, thus ending the play; to go out during the play.

  court card
 One of the picture cards i.e. a King, Queen or Jack in a French pack; a King, Ober or Unter in a German pack, or a King, Queen, Cavalier and Valet in a Tarot pack. Also face card, picture card or royal card. Originally coat card.

  cover
 To play a higher card of the same suit than any previously played to the trick. Also play over (but that can also mean to play any higher card). Not to be confused with go over, head the trick or overtake.

  cross-ruff
 Two partners alternately trumping a different suit.

  cross-suit
 Suit of the opposite colour.

   Cups
 One of the four suits in a Latin-suited pack of cards. Symbol:  or 

  cut
 To divide the deck into two parts; usually after shuffling. Cards may also be cut to determine who deals or which suit is trumps.

D 
  dead card
 One that cannot be used in the play.

  deadwood
 Unmatched cards remaining in the hand e.g. in Rummy.

  deal
 Verb: To distribute cards to players in accordance with the rules of the card game being played. In many games, this involves picking up all the cards, shuffling them, having them cut and redistributing them, but in other games (such as Patience games) it simply involves turning over the wastepile to act as a new stock.
 Noun: The play from the time the cards are dealt until they are redealt. Also referred to as a hand

  dealer
 The person whose turn and responsibility it is to deal the cards.

  deck
 May refer either to the pack or the stock / talon.

  declaration
 Announcement of melds or scoring combinations, as in Piquet. Dummett prefers to restrict 'declaration' to this sense, while preferring 'announcement' for the intention to achieve certain feats in play i.e. the 2nd meaning below.
 The game at which a deal is played. A call or bid.

  declare
 To bid or to announce the trump.
 To announce; predict schneider or schwarz.
 To meld or show.
 To count out.
Note: Dummett prefers to restrict 'announce' for the intention to achieve certain feats in play, while using 'declare' for a statement that one has a special combination of cards in one's hand.

  declarer
 In a contract game, the highest bidder who then tries to achieve the announced contract.

  declaring side, declaring team
 The side that wins the auction. The player who made the highest bid and his or her partner who join forces to achieve the announced contract.

  defenders
 The opponents of the declarer(s) in card games like Bridge or Skat. Originally those 'defending' the pool (see Pigott's Hoyle (1800).).

  denomination
The rank of a card e.g. 2, 3, 4, etc.

  Deuce
 The Two of any suit. In German-suited packs, the Deuce is nowadays usually called the Ace despite having 2 suit symbols. In Austria and Bavaria usually called the Sow (Sau).

  Diamonds
 One of the four suits in a French pack of cards. Symbol: 

  discard
  To get rid of plain suit cards when unable to follow suit and unwilling or unable to trump.
 To lay away cards, e.g. of high value or to void a suit, after picking up from the talon or skat.
 A card that is removed from the hand in either of those ways.

  discard pile
 The pile of cards already rejected by players. The common pile of discarded cards. Also wastepile.

  double, redouble
 To increase the game value by a factor of 2. Redoubling effectively quadruples the original game value.

  double-ended, double-figured, double-headed
 Of a playing card, being designed to be read either way up by having indices at each end and, in the case of court cards, dividing the picture horizontally or diagonally and displaying only the upper part of the figure at each end. Also reversible. See single-ended.

  doubleton
 Only two cards of the same suit in the hand.

  downcard
 A card lying face down.

 draw
 To take a card from the stock (talon). Also 'buy' e.g. in Rummy.

 draw lots
 To select e.g. the first dealer by letting players choose a card at random from the fanned pack or by cutting the pack

 drop
 To withdraw from the current deal; to discard one's hand rather than stake enough chips to stay in the game.

 dummy, dummy hand
 A hand dealt to an imaginary extra player, and often played out according to certain rules.

 durch, durchmarsch
 See march.

E 
  elder
 Sitting at the left (when the rotation is clockwise.
 Non-dealer in two-hand play.

  eldest
 Of several players, the one nearest the dealer's left when the rotation is clockwise. May not necessarily be eldest hand.
 Short for eldest hand.

  eldest hand
 This is the player to the left of the dealer in games that are played clockwise; or to the right of the dealer in those played anti-clockwise and who is usually first to bid or declare and play. The first player to play in the round. Called forehand in many games.

  empty card
 In Tarock games, a card without a special point value, usually a pip card, but sometimes also an ordinary trump (i.e. not one of the Trull cards.

  endhand
 See rearhand.

  entrump
 To make a particular suit trumps.

  establish
 To make cards the best by forcing out adverse higher cards; to clear.

  established suit
 A suit is established if when you or your partner can take every trick in it, regardless of who leads.

  exit
 To relinquish the lead; force another player to win the trick.

F 
  face
 The side of a card depicting its rank
 To turn a card so that its rank is visible and its back underneath

  face card
 See court card.

  face down
 With the denomination side of the card downwards and its back upwards.

  faceup (US)
 A card positioned so that it reveals its suit and value. Also upcard.

  face value
 The marked value of a card. Also pip value. Court cards are usually take to have a value of 10, the Ace 1 or 11.

  fall of the cards
 The identity and order in which cards are played, especially as it gives an indication of the location of unplayed cards.

  fan
 To spread cards fanwise. To spread a hand or pack of cards, face up, in an arc so that they can be identified from their corner indices. Alternatively to spread them, face down, in order to enable players to 'draw lots' in order, for example, to choose teams or the first dealer.
 An arc of cards so fanned. A spread of face-up cards.
 In Patience, a small number of cards laid in an overlapping row, so that only one is exposed.

  fatten
 To discard counting cards to one's partner's tricks. Also smear.

  fat trick
 A trick that is rich in counting cards.

  fiche
 A long rectangular counter used in some French card games and Danish Tarok that is worth a number of jetons, typically 10 or 20. See also contrat.

  finesse
 An attempt to take a trick with a card that is not the best of the suit.

  first hand
 The leader to a trick.
 The first player to call.
 Eldest hand.

  flush
 Cards of the same suit.

  fold
 To withdraw or surrender the current hand or game.
 To withdraw from the auction having been overcalled.

  follow suit
 To play a card of the led suit.

 force
 To compel a player to trump a trick in order to win it. A player may 'force out' trumps by leading a long plain suit in which the opponent is void.
 A compulsory round or deal in which all players must play and none may drop out. Also known in German games as a 'muss'. See Schafkopf.

  forehand
 Another term for eldest hand usually in card games originating from Europe. The player who is usually first to receive cards, bid and play. Sits to the left of the dealer in clockwise games and right of the dealer in anticlockwise games.
 The player who has the right to lead to a trick. Also said to be "in forehand".

  French-suited pack
 A pack of cards with the four suits: Clubs, Spades, Hearts and Diamonds. So-called because it originated in France, but now used worldwide. Compare with German and Latin-suited pack. The standard 52-card pack consists of French-suited cards which may be of various patterns (English/International, Belgian-Genoese, Dondorf, Swedish, etc.).

  free card
 A card with special privileges when led to a trick e.g. the Sevens in Bruus or the Eights and Nines in Knüffeln.
 A card that cannot be beaten because all the trumps have been exhausted.
 A card that cannot be beaten because all the trumps and higher cards have been played.

G 
  game
 A pastime in general, usually involving some form of competing.
 A variant of a basic game e.g. Gin Rummy or Wendish Schafkopf.
 A bid, declaration or contract.
 A period in a session of play which results in a winner.
 The target number of points as in "game is 100 points".
 Fulfilment of the declared contract as in "their team made game".
 A style or system of play.

  game points
 In point-trick games, the score awarded to the players based on the outcome of a hand, the game value of a contract and any bonuses earned. Game points are accumulated (or deducted) to decide the overall winner. Not to be confused with card points.

  game value
 The amount a contract is worth in points or hard score

  German-suited pack
 A pack of cards with the four suits: Acorns, Leaves, Hearts and Bells. So-called because it originated in Germany. Such packs are common in Austria, Germany, north Italy, Hungary and several other countries in eastern Europe. Compare with French and Latin-suited pack. 

 good
 Concession by a player that he or she accepts the bid and does not wish to bid against it. May be announced with "good."

 go out
 To finish playing in the current deal because a) you have got rid of all your cards (e.g. in Rummy or Domino or b) you have achieved the tricks or points needed to win (e.g. in Fipsen or Sixty-Six).

 go over
 To bid higher; overcall.
 To play a higher card than any so far played to the trick. Also head the trick or play over (but that can also mean to play a higher card of the same suit). Not to be confused with cover or overtake.

  guard
 One or more cards that protect a high card. A high card may be singly guarded, twice guarded, etc.

H 
  hand
 The cards held by one player ("playing hand")
 The player holding the cards, as in "Third hand bid 1."
 Synonymous with the noun usage of deal.

  hand card
 A card held in the hand as opposed to one on the table.

  hand game or handplay.
 A type of contract in certain games in which the skat or widow is not used. See Hand game (cards).

  hard score
 A game played for 'hard score' – as opposed to those played for soft score – is one played for money. Coins may be used to stake; alternatively chips or counters with an agreed monetary value may be utilised.

  head the trick
 To play a better (i.e. higher) card than any already played to the trick. Also go over or play over (but that can also mean to play a higher card of the same suit). Not to be confused with cover or overtake.

  Hearts
 One of the four suits in a French pack or German pack of cards. Symbols:  or 

  hold
 As an earlier bidder in the auction, to match a higher bid, thus retaining the right to play a contract.

  hold up
 To refrain from playing (a high card). Also 'hold back'.

  honour
 A card attracting a bonus score or side payment, usually to the player or team for holding and declaring them, but sometimes for capturing them in play. From the French honneur. See matador.

  house
 See banker.

I 
  index
 The number or letter printed in the corner of a playing card, so that it may be read when held in a fan.

  in turn
 A player, or an action, is said to be in turn if that player is expected to act next under the rules. Jerry said "check" while he was in turn, so he's not allowed to raise.

  invite
 To lead a small card of the long suit.

J 

  jan, jann
 The equivalent of lurch or schneider in north German or Scandinavian games. It may mean losing without taking a trick, as in games of the Bruus family, or scoring less than 1/4 of the points, as in games of the Sjavs family.

  Jack
 The court card ranking, naturally, between the Queen and the Ten. Also called the Knave or Valet in certain card games.

  jeton
 A circular counter which forms the basic unit of scoring or payment, especially in French card games. Often used along with fiches and contrats which are worth more. See also chip.

  Joker
 A card, usually depicting a jester, used as the highest trump or as a wild card.

K 

  kibitzer
 Onlooker at a card game.

  kind
 See rank.

  King
 The highest court card, usually ranking between the Ace and the Queen.

  king card
 The best card remaining unplayed of the suit. Also best card, commanding card and master card.

  kitty
Additional cards dealt face down in some card games.

  Knave
 The Jack in certain card games. Also Valet.

  knock
 As the cutter, to tap the pack with a fist to indicate that you are satisfied with the shuffle and are happy not to cut the cards. Common informal practice in social or family circles in European countries.

L 
  Latin-suited pack
 A pack of cards with the four suits: Swords, Batons, Cups and Coins. So-called because it originated in Spain and Italy. Compare with French and German-suited pack. 

  lay away
 To discard after picking up the skat or widow.

  lay down
 To meld a combination.

  lay off
 To add cards to another player's melds or combinations.

  lead
  To play the first card of the trick.
  The card played first to the trick.
  The privilege of leading e.g. "A has the lead" or "A is on lead".

  Leaves
 One of the four suits in a German pack of cards. Symbol: 

  led card
 The first card played to a trick. Sometimes called the leading card.

  led suit
 The suit of the first card played to a trick. The suit of the lead card.

  lone hand, lone player
 A player who chooses to play without the help of his partner's hand.

  long card
 A card left in one's hand after all opponents are exhausted of that suit. Similarly, long cards are the dregs of a suit which has been led several times and exhausted in the hands of other players.

  long suit
 A suit containing more than four cards e.g. at Whist or the suit with the most cards in a player's hand.

  loser
 A player who has lost a game.
 A losing card.

  losing card
 A card that is unlikely to win a trick.

  low card
 A card of low rank
 A card of low value, especially in Tarot and Tarock games.

  lurch
 A player is 'lurched' or 'in the lurch' in card games like Cribbage, Saunt or Cassino if they not only lose but fail to score a minimum number of points, typically half of a winning score. Being in the lurch typically costs double. Similar to schneider.

M 
  march
 Euchre term, from the German Marsch or Durchmarsch. To win every trick in a deal. The score for doing so. The same as slam.

  make
 Fulfil a contract.
 Name the trump suit or contract.

  maker
 The player who names the contract. Also declarer or contractor.

  master, master card
 The best (i.e. highest) card left in a suit which has been played. Also best card, commanding card or king card.
 The highest card in play from a particular suit.

  matador
 A top trump, sometimes with special privileges. However, in some card games such as Skwitz, it is not a trump but a bonus-earning card. Any high trump.

  match
 A card game session comprising a number of rounds after which scores are finalised and a winner declared.
 To play a card of the same value of the card or cards on the table, for example in fishing games.

  matsch
 A slam in certain Austrian or Bavarian games.
 Failing to win at least a quarter of the points available in some German games. Equivalent to a schneider.

  meld
 Any scoring combination of cards announced, shown or played, e.g. three of a kind or a sequence of three or more cards. A declaration of such a combination.
  To make a meld.

  misère
 A contract or undertaking to lose every trick. Also bettel, bettler or null.

  mixed deal
 A hand dealt wrongly. Or to make a mistake while dealing cards.

  mord
 A slam in certain Austrian or German games.

  multipliers
 Factors by which the base value of a declaration (and sometimes any bonuses) are multiplied to determine the value of a game.

N 
  natural
 Without the use of a wild.

  natural card
 A card that is not wild

  natural order, natural ranking
 The normal hierarchical sequence of cards within a suit. In a 52-card, French-suited pack the natural order is from Ace (high) to Two (low) i.e. A > K > Q > J > 10 … 2. In a 36-card German-suited pack, it is from Deuce ("Ace") to Seven i.e. D (A) > O > U > 10 … 7. Many games do not follow the natural order, for example, in Ace-Ten games the ranking is A > 10 > K > Q > J... or D (A) > 10 > K > O > U...

  natural suit
 The suit that a card would naturally belong to if not designated as e.g. a trump

  negative game
 A negative game or negative contract is one in which the aim is to:
 Avoid taking tricks
 Lose every trick (as in Bettel or misère)
 Avoid taking the highest number of points (as in a Räuber in games like Cego).

  next, next suit
 The suit of the same colour as the trump suit e.g. in Euchre.
 The suit paired with the trump suit e.g. in Schlauch. For this purpose Acorns are usually paired with Leaves and Hearts with Bells.

  non-counter
 A card which is not a counter i.e. has no scoring value.

  null, null game
 In games of the Skat family, a contract in which the declarer undertakes to lose every trick.
 In Swedish Whist, a game in which both sides aim to take the fewest number of tricks.

  numeral
 A card for which the rank is a number (Ace usually counts as 1 in this case), as opposed to the court cards. Also pip. See also Pip (counting).

O 

  Ober
 The court card usually ranking between the King and the Unter in a German-suited pack. The equivalent of the Queen in a French-suited pack. Formerly also Obermann ("overlord").

  open
 To make the first bid, declaration or move.
 To make the first bet.
 To make the first lead of a suit. "It was correct to open Diamonds..."

  opening lead
 The first lead of a deal.

  outbid
 To bid higher than an earlier bidder. Same as overcall, but distinct from overbid.

 ouvert(e)
 A contract played with the player's hand of cards spread out face up on the table so it is visible to the other players

  overbid
 A bid of more than the value of the game.
 Overcall.
 An unduly optimistic bid.

  overcall
 To bid higher than an earlier bidder. May take the form of a suit overcall (bid a higher-value suit e.g. in Preference), majority overcall (bid to take a higher number of tricks e.g. in Fipsen) or value overcall (bid to win more card points e.g. in Binokel) The name of such a bid.

 overs
 Excess points in e.g. Cassino.

 overshoot point
 In point-trick games, a point in excess of the minimum needed to win the deal.

  overtake
 To play a card higher than the winning card played by your partner, unnecessary to win the trick but necessary to gain the lead. Not to be confused with cover, go over, head the trick or play over.

  overtrick
 To take more tricks than bid or contracted.
 A trick exceeding the bid.

  overruff, overtrump
 To play a trump higher than any previously played to the trick.

P 
  pack
 A complete set of cards. In English-speaking countries, a standard pack comprises 52 French-suited cards. In other countries, packs of 24, 32, 36, 40 or 48 cards are common as are German or Latin-suited packs. Also deck.

  packet
 A portion of a pack, less than the whole pack.

  pair royal
 Three cards of the same denomination (rank). Also called a 'prial' or 'triplet'. See set.

  partie
 A game which requires a specified number of deals to decide it, especially at Piquet. See also rubber.

  partner
 Another player with whom one shares a common score, and with whom one therefore cooperates in bidding and play.

  partnership
 Two or more players who play jointly and win or lose together. May be 'fixed', in which case the players play together for the entire session, or 'floating', in which case partners vary from deal to deal, sometimes called an alliance. Also called a side or team.

  pass
 In bidding games, to make no bid. Usually called by saying "pass".
 In vying games to pass the privilege of betting first.

  penalty
 A score awarded for common violations of the rules of the game. It can be awarded either negatively to the violating player/partnership, or positively to their opponent(s)

  penalty card
 A card that incurs a penalty, usually a minus score, e.g. the Queen of Spades and all hearts in Black Lady.

  penny ante
 A game played for insignificant stakes.

  picture card
 Usually the same as court card, but can include the Aces as well.

  pile
 A set of cards placed on a surface so that they partially or completely overlap. Also stack.

  pip
 A numeral.
 A suit symbol (e.g.
 A card point in point-trick games. Not necessarily the same as the actual number of pips (symbols) on a pip card. Court cards also have a pip value.

  pip card
 See numeral.

  pip value
 The numerical, index or face value of a card.

  plain card
 a card other than a court card.

  plain suit
 Any suit that is not a trump suit.

 play
  To contribute a card to a trick.
  To move a card to a place on the table (either from the players hand, or from elsewhere on the table), in Patience games.
  The card played or the move made.
  The stage of the game during which the players' hands are depleted by plays to tricks or to a common pile, etc. The "rules of play" are the rules for playing tricks, etc. e.g. stating that players must follow suit if able, otherwise may play any card (as at Whist).
 Betting in general.

 play over
 To play a higher card.
 To cover i.e. play a higher card of the same suit. Not to be confused with go over, head the trick or overtake.

 pone
US term for non-dealer in some two-player card games e.g. Colonel or the player on the dealer's right, who cuts the cards.

  pool
 See pot.

  positional priority
 The priority a player has by virtue of his position in relation to the dealer and direction of play. Normally forehand or eldest hand has the highest priority, followed by the other players in the order of play. So, for example, in an auction if two players bid the same ranking contract and play is clockwise, the player nearest the dealer's left hand usually has priority.

  pot
 A container into which money or chips are paid initially and during a game and from which the winnings are paid out.
 The contents of the pot. An accumulation of chips, antes, bets, forfeits, etc., to win which is the object of the game.

  preference
 A bid in the preferred suit.

  preferred suit, preference suit
 A suit that has bidding preference over the rest, as in Boston, Préférence or Fipsen.

 prial
 A 'pair royal'. A set of three cards of the same rank.

 protection.
 Cards that guard others, normally of higher rank.

  punter
 Person who lays bets in a banking game.

Q 

 quart
 A sequence of four cards of the same suit.

 quart major
 The Ace, King, Queen and Jack of one suit.

 Queen
 The court card ranking naturally between the King and the Jack or Knave. In Tarot and Tarock games, it ranks between the King and the Cavalier.

 quinte or quint
 A sequence of five cards of the same suit.

 quinte major or quint major
 The Ace, King, Queen, Jack and Ten of one suit.

 quinte minor or quint minor
 The King, Queen, Jack, Ten and Nine of one suit.

 quitted trick
 A trick that has been taken and turned face down.

R 
  raise
 To name a higher contract than one has called previously because one has been overcalled
 To increase one's stake
 To increase the game value

  rank
 The position of a card relative to others in the same suit. The order of the ranks depends on the game being played.

  rearhand
 Usually refers to the player who sits to the right of the dealer in a four-handed, clockwise game. However, in a three-hand play, rearhand is the dealer; the last active player to receive cards. Also called endhand.
 The last player to the trick. Also said to be "in rearhand".

  redeal
 A new deal by the same dealer after an irregularity.
A new deal of some of the cards, e.g. the wastepile in Patience games.
 The action of dealing again.

  redouble
 To double, again, a bid that has already been doubled once.

  reduce
 To shed one's hand of deadwood e.g. in Rummy.

  regular pack
 A pack of cards comprising suits each distinguished by a suit sign and divided into numeral and court cards, as opposed to a Tarot pack that has additional cards known variously as tarots, tarocks or tarocchi and which do not have suit signs, numerals and courts.

  renege
 To revoke. This is the most common usage.
 To legally play a card of a suit other than the led suit.
 To legally withhold a high trump when a lower trump is led.

  renounce
 To fail to follow suit legally because one is void; a void. This is the most common usage.
 Of a suit, void. Having none of the suit led.
 To play a card of a different suit from the led suit. May be legal or not, depending on the rules.

  return
 To lead back, usually the suit that partner led.

  reverse game
 A game in which the aim is to lose points or tricks rather than win them

  reversible
 See double-ended. 

  revoke
 To fail to follow suit when able to do so and the rules require it. Normally incurs a penalty.
 To breach the rules of following suit, trumping, heading or going over.

  rob
 To exchange a hand card for the trump turn-up.
 To discard several cards in exchange for the remaining trumps in the pack.

  rotation
 The direction of dealing, bidding and playing e.g. clockwise (to the left) is standard for American and English games. Anticlockwise (to the right) is common in traditional European games.

  round
 The events between the eldest player's action, and the youngest player's action of the same type (i.e. deal, bid, play), inclusive. A phase of play in which everyone has the same opportunity to perform such an action.
 A series of hands in which each player has dealt only once.

  round game
 One in which there are no partnerships and everyone plays for himself or herself.
 One playable by an indefinite number of players, typically 3 to 7.

  royal card
 See court card.

  rubber
 A match consisting of a number of games, typically three or five.

  ruff
 To trump a suit i.e. when a non-trump was led.
 An instance of ruffing.
 Historically, to rob the trump turnup.

  run
 A combination of three or more playing cards with consecutive rank values. Also called a sequence.

S 
  sandbag
 To withhold an action on a good hand in order to trap an opponent into greater loss.

  scat
 See skat.

  schmear
 See smear.

  schneider
 When a player or team wins over 3/4 of the available card points in point-trick games, thus scoring a bonus. Typical of the Skat and Schafkopf families. The team scoring less than 1/4 of the points is said to be schneidered or 'in schneider. The successful player or team is said to have won schneider. See also lurch.

 schwarz
 When a player or team wins every trick of the hand, thus scoring a bonus. The other side is said to be schwarzed. Common in games of the Skat and Schafkopf family.

  seat
 Position relative to the dealer: for example, in bridge, the dealer's left-hand opponent is said to be in second seat.

  second hand
 The second player in turn to call or play.

  second turn
 The turning over of the second card of the skat for trump, e.g. in Reunion or Skat.

  see, seeing
 To hold a higher bet in a vying game.

 see saw
 See cross-ruff.

  selected suit
 See chosen suit.

  sequence
 Three or more cards adjacent in rank. The adjectives ascending and descending may be applied (i.e. "building in ascending sequence" means "laying cards out so that each has the next highest rank to the previous one"). A sequence need not all be of the same suit. Also run.

  set
 Three or more cards of the same rank.

  shed
 To discard.

  short deck
 See short pack.

  short game
 Any game in which not all the cards of a pack are put into play, e.g. kurzer or short Schafkopf which is played with 24 cards.

  short suit
 A suit with less than four cards, two cards or fewer than the average cards for the suit.

  short pack, shortened pack
 A set of cards that has been reduced in size from a full pack (normally of 52 cards) by the removal of a certain card or cards.

  shuffle
 Rearrange (a deck of cards) by sliding the cards over each other quickly.(verb)
 An act of shuffling a deck of cards. (noun)

  shut out
 Defeated without a single point.

  side
 See partnership.

  side card
 A card of a side suit; a non-trump.

  side money
 A bet in a side pot.

  side payment
 When players are primarily playing for the stakes in a pot, this is a separate payment directly from one player's pocket to another, for example to reward a bonus.

  side pot
 A pot that is separate from the main pot, either for specific bonuses or used when the main pot reaches a certain limit.

  side strength
 A player with side strength has high cards in side suits.

  side suit
 A suit that is not the trump suit; plain suit.

  signal
 Any convention of play whereby the team members properly give each other information as allowed by the rules.
 Any permitted physical sign or gesture, such as winking or tapping the table when playing a card, that conveys information to one's partner(s).

  single, singly
 The basic, usually lowest, value of a game is described as 'single'. A game is won 'singly' if its value is not increased by bonus factors such as winning schneider which would double the score or winning schwarz which might quadruple it.

  single-ended, single-figured, single-headed
 Of a playing card, being designed so that it can only be properly read one way up. There are usually no indices and the courts depict full length figures. Today they have been largely replaced by double-ended or reversible cards.

  singleton
 Only one card of a suit.

  skat or scat
 Widow; extra cards dealt to the table which may be used for exchanging later. Also blind.
 Note that, in German, 'skat' can also mean void i.e. lacking any cards of a given suit and therefore 'seeking the skat' means looking for an opponent's void suit.

 slam
 Winning every trick. Sometimes called a 'grand slam', with a 'little slam' being every trick bar one. Also called a march (e.g. Euchre), mord (e.g. Brandle and Grasobern), durch or durchmarsch, (e.g. Skat and Schafkopf), matsch, tout or vole.

  sleeping
 Said of cards that are not in play because e.g. they are in the unused part of the pack. See active.

  sluff or slough
 To discard. To play a card of little or no value.

  smear or schmear
 To play a high-scoring card to a trick if it is likely to be won by one's partner, especially in Schafkopf or Sheepshead. Also fatten.

  sneak
 Lead a singleton in order to be able to trump (ruff) the second round of the suit.

  soft score
 A game played for 'soft score' – as opposed to hard score is one played for anything other than money, usually points. The score may be chalked on a slate, recorded with pencil and paper. Equally, counters, tokens or chips or even matches may be used.

  solo
 A hand contract i.e. one played without the aid of the skat or widow.
 A contract played alone against the combined efforts of all other players.

  soloist
 Player who plays a solo.

  sous-forcer
See underforce.

  Spades
 One of the four suits in a French pack of cards. Symbol: 

  spot card
 See numeral

   squeeze
 In trick-taking game, a player is 'squeezed' if he has to weaken himself in either of 2 suits, but has no way of deciding which.

  stack
 A pile of cards, less than the whole pack, placed on top of each other and usually face down.

  stake
 The money, counters or chips that a player places during a game.
 The agreed monetary amount to be paid for each point, game or rubber.

  staking board
 A board with compartments, cards or marked areas on which stakes are laid during a game as in Newmarket or Poch.

  staking layout
 A marked-out area on the table or a set of face-up cards on which stakes are placed.

  stand
 Refuse to draw additional cards.
 Accept the turn-up as trump.
 Remain in the current deal or pot, as opposed to drop.

  stay
 Remain in the current deal or pot, as opposed to drop.
 Refuse to draw additional cards. Also stick.

  stick
 Stand fast and refuse to draw additional cards.

  stock
 A pile of cards, face down, which are left over after setting up the rest of the game (i.e. dealing hands, setting up other layout areas) and will be used in the rest of the game. Also talon.

  stop, stop card
 A card which, when played, ends a sequence of cards on the table or a card that is undealt whose absence prevents the completion of a sequence. Gives its name to the Stops family of games.

  Stops family, Stops group
 A family or group of matching games in which cards must be played in ascending sequence and usually in suit. The aim is to be first to shed all one's cards. The cards out of play or which terminate the sequence are called stops. Examples include Comet, Pope Joan, Michigan, Newmarket and Yellow Dwarf.

  suit
 Any of the sets of cards in a pack that share the same pip symbol. For examples see French-suited pack, German-suited pack and Latin-suited pack.

  sweetener
 An additional stake anted to the pot in Poker to encourage players to stay in the game.
 A small bet in Poker not meant to cause an opponent to fold but to build up the pot.
 An agreed amount that everyone pays into the pot following an auction in which all passed e.g. in Schafkopf. The pot goes to the next player to win a bid.

  sweep
 In fishing games to clear the table by capturing all the table cards upon it at that time. Usually earns a bonus.
 The cards so captured.

  swing
 Lead the master card of a suit.
 One of an unbroken sequence of cards from the top of the suit downwards.

  Swords
 One of the four suits in a Latin-suited pack of cards. Symbol:  or 

 T 
 tableau
 Layout of face-up table cards in games like Yellow Dwarf, Zwicker and games of the Patience family. See Glossary of patience terms.

  talon
The undealt portion of the pack which will be used in the rest of the game. Also stock.

  Tarocchi
 Trump cards in tarot games of Italian origin. Also Tarock or Tarocchi in games from other countries.

  Tarock
 A trump card in tarot games of Austrian or German origin. Also Tarot or Tarocchi in games from other countries. Also spelt Taroc or Tarok.

  Tarot
 A trump card in tarot games of French origin. Also Tarock or Tarocchi in games from other countries.

  team
 See partnership.

  tenace
 A combination of high cards not in sequence. Major tenace: A-Q (or K-C in Tarock games); minor tenace: K-J (or Q-J in Tarock games); double tenace: A-Q-10 (or K-C-10/A in Tarock games).

  throw in
 To return cards to the dealer if, for example, no-one makes a bid or if the cards are misdealt.

  throw off
 To discard or smear.

  touching
 Said of cards that are adjacent in rank.

  tout
 Winning all the tricks in European games. Also durch, durchmarsch, march, matsch, slam or vole.

  Trey
 The Three of any suit. Also 'three-spot'.

  trick
 See Trick-taking game. A set of cards played by each player in turn, during the play of a hand.

  triplet
 Three of a kind.

  tripleton
 Three cards of a suit in the hand.

  trump
  A privileged card whose trick-taking power is greater than any plain suit card.
 The trump suit.
  A card in the special suit of trumps found in tarot packs such as the Tarot Nouveau.
  To play a trump after a plain suit has been led. Also ruff.

  trump suit
 A privileged suit in which, in the current deal, all its cards rank higher than any plain (=non-trump) card.

  turn the corner
 Said of a sequence of cards when the top card (typically the Ace or King) is preceded by high cards on one side and low cards on the other e.g. 3-2-A-K-Q-J.

  turn-up, turnup
 A card turned up at the start of a game to determine the trump suit.

 U 
  ultimo
 Winning the last trick with the lowest trump or, sometimes, with a King.

  unchosen suit
 In games of the Karnöffel Group, a suit, usually ranking in the natural order, most of all of whose cards have no special privileges, in contrast to the chosen suits. Sometimes called an unselected suit.

  underforce or under-force
To answer a card with one of the same suit, but inferior value to those remaining in hand; e.g. putting the Nine of Clubs on the Ten, having the Ace in hand. Also under-force, under-play or sous-forcer.

  underlead
 To lead a low card when holding the top card or cards in a suit.

  underplay or under-play
 To lead or follow suit with a lower card when holding a higher one; hold up; refuse to cover.
 See underforce.

  undershoot point
 In point-trick games, a point shy of the minimum needed to win the deal.

  undertrick
 To fall short of the declared number of tricks.
 A trick short of the bid.

  unguarded
 Unprotected by another, usually lower, card of the same suit. See also blank.

  unload
 To get rid of dangerous cards from one's hand.

  unselected suit
 See unchosen suit.

  Unter
 The court card usually ranking between the Ober and the Ten in a German-suited pack. The equivalent of the Jack in a French-suited pack. Formerly also Untermann ("underling").

  upcard
 A card laid on the table face-up.
 The top card of a pile, turned face up.

 V 
  Valet
 The Jack in certain card games. Also Knave.

  value
 See card points

  variant
 A game version whose aim, mechanism of play, equipment or tactics are sufficiently different for it to be viewed as a separate, albeit related, game.

  variation
 A game version in which there are minor rule differences, but in which the aim, mechanism of play and tactics remain the same.
 A minor rule difference.

  vie, vying
 To claim you have, or will have, the best hand and stake money on it. Vying includes an element of bluffing.

 void
 Having no card of a given suit. Also blank suit.
 To discard all cards of a given suit.

  vole
 Winning all the tricks in some English and European games. Also durch, durchmarsch, march, matsch, slam or tout.

 W 
  wastepile or waste-pile
 A pile of discards or cards that a player is unable to play. Also discard pile.

  whitewashed
 Losing without scoring a point. See also schwarz.

  widow
 American term for a blind or skat. Hand of cards dealt face down on the table at the start of play that may subsequently be used by players to exchange cards.

  wild card
 A card that may be designated by the owner to represent any other card. A Joker is often used as a wild card, but can also have other uses.

 Y 
  youngest
 The last player to play before the eldest player's second turn. Some family games will use eldest and youngest to refer to the players' actual ages.

 Game-specific glossaries 
A few games or families of games have enough of their own specific terminology to warrant their own glossaries:

 Blackjack. See the glossary of blackjack terms.
 Bridge. See the glossary of contract bridge terms which covers contract bridge, duplicate bridge, and auction bridge; some of the terms are also used in whist, bid whist, and other trick-taking games.
 Patience or Solitaire. See the glossary of patience and solitaire terms.
 Poker. See the glossary of poker terms.
 Schafkopf. See Schafkopf language.
 Skat.''' See the glossary of Skat terms.

 Footnotes 

 References 

 Literature 
•	_ (1881). Ausführliche anleitung zum Deutschtarokspielen. Munich: Cäsar Fritsch. 88 pp.
 
 
 
 
 
 Dummett, Sir Michael (1980). The Game of Tarot. London: Duckworth.
 
 
 
 
 
 Goren, Charles (1950). Goren's Hoyle. NY: Greystone.
 
 
 
 
 Pardon, George Frederick (1864). The Card Player. London: Routledge, Warne & Routledge.
 Parlett, David (1979). The Penguin Book of Patience''. London: Penguin.
 
 
 
 
 
 
 

 Card game terms
 Glossary
Wikipedia glossaries using description lists